Inferior artery may refer to

 Inferior alveolar artery
 Inferior hypophysial artery
 Inferior epigastric artery
 Inferior genicular arteries
 Inferior gluteal artery
 Inferior labial artery
 Inferior laryngeal artery
 Inferior lateral genicular artery
 Inferior medial genicular artery
 Inferior mesenteric artery
 Inferior pancreaticoduodenal artery
 Inferior phrenic arteries
 Inferior rectal artery
 Inferior suprarenal artery
 Inferior thyroid artery
 Inferior tympanic artery
 Inferior vesical artery